NIGELEC (Société Nigérienne d'Electricité, Nigerien Electricity Society) is the Parastatal electric power generation and transmission utility in Niger.  It is majority owned by the Government of Niger and was founded in 1968.  In 2006 NIGELEC had 178964 subscribers and 300 electrified centers.  The NIGELEC management is overseen by the Ministry of Mines and Energy.

NIGELEC operates four power plants: Niamey I and Niamey II (in Niamey proper and the suburb of Goudel), the Malbaza Power Station  (at Malbaza, near Tahoua) and the Zinder & Maradi Thermal Power Station (near Zinder).

See also
 SONIDEP

References

External links
Niger: Issues and Options in the Energy Sector. Report No. 4642-NIR of the joint UNDP/World Bank Energy Sector Assessment Program. (May 1984)

Electric power companies of Niger